Huang is a Chinese surname that originally means and refers to jade people were wearing and decorating in ancient times. While Huáng is the pinyin romanization of the word, it may also be romanized as Hwang, Wong, Waan, Wan, Waon, Hwong, Vong, Hung, Hong, Bong, Eng, Ng, Uy, Wee, Oi, Oei, Oey, Ooi, Ong, or Ung due to pronunciations of the word in different dialects and languages. It is the 96th name on the Hundred Family Surnames poem.

This surname is known as Hwang in Korean. In Vietnamese, the name is known as Hoàng or Huỳnh.

Huang is the 7th most common surname in China. Huynh is the 5th most common surname in Vietnam. The population of Huangs in China and Taiwan was estimated at more than 35 million in 2020; it was also the surname of more than 2 million overseas Chinese, 5.7 million Vietnamese (6%), and an estimated 1 million Koreans (The 2015 census of South Korea revealed it was the surname for 697,171 South Koreans, ranked 16th).

Huang is also the pinyin romanization of the very rare surname .

Pronunciations/transliterations
 Huang 黃,皇 used in Mandarin
Hwang 황,黃,皇 used in Korean
 Huỳnh or Hoàng, used in Vietnamese. Huỳnh is the cognate adopted in Southern and most parts of Central Vietnam because of a naming taboo decree which banned the surname Hoàng, due to similarity between the surname and the name of Lord Nguyễn Hoàng.
 Vong, anglicized from Hakka, used in Vietnamese
 Ng, Ung, Ong, Wee, Oi, Ooi or Uy, used in Minnan and the Hokkien-speaking Chinese diaspora in Southeast Asia
 Ooi in Zhangzhou dialect and Penang
 Ng, Eng used in Quanzhou dialect and Teochew
 Wong, used in Cantonese, Wu and Fuzhou dialect
 Oei or Oey, used among Teochews in Indonesia
 OENG, EUNG,  UENG, UNG, ING(អ៊ឹង) used in Cambodia
 EUNG or UENG (แซ่อึ้ง) used in Thailand

Origins
Huang is an ancient surname. According to tradition, there are several different sources of Huang surname origin, for example as descendants of Bo Yi, Lu Zhong (陸終) or Tai Tai (臺駘). There were also at least three Huang Kingdoms 黃國 during Xia 夏朝, Shang 商朝 and Zhou 周朝 dynasties.  Most of the people with surname Huang could track back their ancestors to one of the Huang Kingdoms.

Dong Yi Tribe 東夷 
The Dong Yi or Eastern Barbarians were ancient people who lived in eastern China during the prehistoric period. They were one of the Four Barbarians in Chinese culture, along with the Northern Di 北狄, the Southern Man  南蠻, and the Western Rong 西戎. The Dong Yi tribe was the tribal alliance group that consisted of nine tribes in the Huai River Basin 淮水流域: Quan Yi 畎夷, Yu Yi 於夷, Fang Yi 方夷, Huang Yi 黃夷, Bai Yi 白夷, Chi Yi 赤夷, Xuan Yi 玄夷, Feng Yi 風夷 and Yang Yi 陽夷. The Dong Yi tribe people used different birds as their totems and for Huang Yi 黃夷 tribe, Yellow Oriole 黃鶯 was the totem. Later when the people from Huang Yi 黃夷 tribe moved and settled in different parts of China, they adopted Huang 黃 as their surname.

Ying Clan 嬴姓
Shaohao 少皋 had a son, Gao Yao and Gao Yao had a son, Bo Yi. Bo Yi helped Emperor Shun and Yu the Great control the Great Flood and got surname Ying (嬴) at early Xia dynasty period. Bo Yi married Emperor Shun's youngest daughter and had three sons (some accounts mentioned only two sons - Da Lian and Ruo Mu):
 Eldest Son Da Lian 大廉 - Founder of Huang Kingdom 黃國 (Qin Kingdom Founder Fei Zi 非子 and Zhao Kingdom Founder Shu Dai 叔帶 were descendants of Da Lian)
 Second Son Ruo Mu 若木 - Founder of Xu Kingdom 徐國 (his great-great-grandson Fei Chang 費昌 founded Fei Kingdom 費國)
 Third Son En Cheng 恩成 - Founder of Jiang Kingdom 江國

Xia Yu awarded the Huang kingdom to Da Lian, and his descendants are known as the Huangs.
There are total of 14 clans derived from Bo Yi Ying Clan: Lian (廉), Xu (徐), Jiang (江), Qin (秦), Zhao (趙), Huang (黃), Liang (梁), Ma (馬), Ge (葛), Gu (谷), Miao (繆), Zhong (鍾), Fei (費), and Qu (瞿). Rulers of Qin Kingdom, Zhao Kingdom, Qin dynasty and Song dynasty could trace back their ancestor to Bo Yi. Hata Clan (秦氏) of Japan, and Aisin Gioro Clan, Irgen Gioro Clan and Gioro Clan of Manchuria (one of several different opinions) were also derived from Bo Yi Ying Clan.

Ji Clan 姬姓
The lineage of Huang Clan from the Yellow Emperor is as follows:
1) Yellow Emperor 黃帝 -> 2) Chang Yi 昌意 -> 3) Zhuanxu Emperor 顓頊帝 -> 4) Da Ye 大業 (aka Ye the Great) -> 5) Shao Dian 少典 -> 6) Nu Shen 女莘 -> 7) Da Fei 大費 (aka Fei the Great) -> 8) Juan Zhang 卷章 -> 9) Wu Hui 吳回 (also known as Zhurong) -> 10) Lu Zhong 陸終 -> 11) Hui Lian 惠連 (Some accounts state that Hui Lian is son of Fan Ren, son of Lu Zhong). Lu Zhong had six sons: 
 Eldest Son Fan 樊 (also known as Fan Ren 樊人 or Kun Wu 昆吾) - Legendary Pottery Inventor and Founder of Kunwu Kingdom 昆吾國, 
 Second Son Ding 定 (also known as Hui Lian 惠连 or Can Hu 參胡) - Founder of Huang Kingdom 黃國, 
 Third Son Qian (also known as Qian Keng 钱铿) - Legendary God of Longevity and Founder of Da Peng Kingdom 大彭國, 
 Fourth Son Qiu 求 (also known as Qiu Yan 求言 or Kuai Ren 鄶人)- Founder of Kuai Kingdom 鄶國, 
 Fifth Son Yan An 晏安 (also known as Cao An 曹安 or Zao An 遭安) - Founder of Zhu Kingdom 邾國, and 
 Sixth Son Ji 季 (also known as Ji Lian 季连) - Founder of Chu Kingdom 楚國.

In 2220 BC during the reign of Emperor Yao 帝堯, Hui Lian 惠連 scored merits in harnessing river floods. Emperor Yao conferred on Hui Lian the title of Viscount 子 (but the nobility system of ancient China is still not clear) and the state of Can'hu 參胡 (in present-day region of Fenyang, Shanxi province). Emperor Yao renamed Can'hu as State of Huang, and bestowed on Hui Lian the surname Huang 黃 and the name "Yun" 雲. Hence, Hui Lian was also known as Huang Yun 黃雲 or Nan Lu 南陆. Hui Lian became the Progenitor of the Huang surname clan. During Western Zhou dynasty, the rulers of the Huang State was given the title of Duke 公. The descendants of Huang Yun (Hui Lian) ruled the Huang State of Shanxi until the early Spring and Autumn period (722 BC-481 BC) when it was conquered by the State of Jin.

Another lineage of Huang Clan from the Yellow Emperor is as follows:
1) Yellow Emperor 黃帝 -> 2) Shao Hao 少昊 -> 3) Jiao Ji 嬌極 -> 4) Hui Gong 揮公 -> 5) Mei 昧 -> 6) Tai Tai 臺駘. Tai Tai helped Zhuan Xu Emperor 顓頊, and he and his descendants (Jin Tian Clan 金天氏) were enfeoffed with Fen Zhou 汾州 at Fen River 汾河 which was further divided into four kingdoms - Huang Kingdom 黃國, Shen Kingdom 沈國, Ru Kingdom 蓐國 and Si Kingdom 姒國.

Development and emigration
In 891 BC King Xiao of Zhou conferred on the 53rd generation descendant of Hui Lian, Huang Xi 黃熙 (aka Huang Shi 黃石) the nobility of 'Hou' 侯 (marquis) and a fiefdom in the region east of the Han river 漢水 (in present-day region of Yicheng, Hubei province) called 'Huang' 黃 (Not to be confused with the Huang State of Fenyang, Shanxi) with the four states Jiang 江, Huang 黃 (founded by 伯益 Bo Yi's descendants), Dao 道, and Bo 柏 in the Huang river 潢水 valley as vassals. The Huang State of Yicheng, Hubei was known as the Western Huang (Xi Huang 西黃) in history.

During the Jin dynasty (266–420), when northern China was invaded by the barbarian tribes, many northerners (especially the aristocratic clans) moved to south China with the Jin court. It was during this period that the Huang clansmen migrated to Fujian.

According to Min Shu 閩書 (Book of Min) (Quoted from Chung Yoon-Ngan):
"During the second year (of the reign) of Yongjia (308AD) the Central Plain was in chaos and the eight clans:- Lin 林, Huang 黃, Chen 陳, Zheng 鄭, Zhan 詹, Qiu 邱, He 何, and Hu 胡, entered Min 閩 (present day Fujian province, China)."

From the Tang dynasty (618-907) onwards, many Han Chinese migrated from Fujian to Guangdong and the other southern provinces. Huang grew into a big clan in south China and it is the 3rd biggest surname in Southern China today.

Migration to Taiwan began during the transition period from the Ming dynasty (1368–1644) to Qing dynasty (1644–1912), when many Han Chinese followed the Anti-Manchu Ming loyalist forces under Zheng Chenggong, and crossed the Taiwan Strait to Taiwan island.

Huang migration overseas began as early as the 14th century during the Ming dynasty to destinations in Southeast Asia. Migration to Americas began only in the mid-19th century following the forced opening of China's doors to the West. Huang is one of the largest Chinese surname clans in Americas today. The population of overseas Huang Clansmen was estimated at 2 million in 2000.

The another surname 皇 has several origins:
1. The descendants of the Three Emperors of ancient China. 
2. The descendants of Duke Dai of Song's prince named Huangfu Chongshi 皇父充石. 
3.An ancient book Xing Kao 姓考 says Zheng Kingdom has a royal clan named Huang clan 皇氏.

Huang
Huang is the 7th most common surname in China, and the 3rd most common surname in Taiwan. It is also one of the common surnames among Zhuang People, the largest ethnic minority in China, and is also the most common surname in the Guangxi Zhuang Autonomous Region. 19% of people from China with Surname Huang live in  Guangdong Province. The population of people named Huang in China was approximately 29 million and in Taiwan about 1.4 million.
In 2019 Huang was again the seventh most common surname in Mainland China.

A 2013 study found that it was the seventh-most common surname, shared by 32,600,000 people or 2.450% of the population, with the province having the most people being Guangdong.

Historical figures with Huang 黃 surname

Huang Chao 黃巢 (820–884), leader of the Huang Chao rebellion against the Tang dynasty
Huang Chengyan 黃承彥, Eastern Han dynasty scholar
Huang Daopo 黃道婆 (1245–1330), Yuan dynasty Weaver and innovator
Huang Daozhou 黃道週 (1585–1646), Ming dynasty calligrapher and politician named as one of the Four Lords of the Yellow Gate (黃門四君子)
Huang Ding 黃鼎 (1650–1730), Qing dynasty landscape painter and poet
Huang Feihong 黃飛鴻 Wong Fei-hung (1847–1924), Martial artist, physician, acupuncturist, revolutionary, and folk hero during late Qing dynasty
Huang Gai 黃蓋, Eastern Wu general and one of the "Twelve Tiger Generals of Jiangdong" (江東十二虎臣) during the Three Kingdoms period
Huang Gongwang 黃公望 (1269–1345), painter and one of the "Four Masters of the Yuan dynasty"
Huang Ji 黃濟, Ming dynasty imperial painter
Huang Quan 黃權 (?–240), general of Shu Han and later of Cao Wei during the Three Kingdoms period
Huang Ruheng 黃汝亨 (1558–1626), calligrapher during late Ming dynasty
Ong Sum Ping 黃森屏 Huang Senping, Noble of Brunei. Street Name in Brunei Capital of Bandar Seri Begawan Jalan Ong Sum Ping (only street in Brunei with Chinese name) was named after him
Huang Shen 黃慎 (1687–1772), Qing dynasty painter and artistic innovator who was one of the "Eight Eccentrics of Yangzhou"
Huang Tingjian 黃庭堅 (1045–1105), Song dynasty noted filial son, poet, scholar, magistrate, and calligrapher. One of the "Song Four" (宋四家) and one of the "Four Scholar of Su'men" (蘇門四學士)
Huang Xie 黃歇 (314 BC–238 BC), Lord Chunshen, Prime Minister of the state of Chu during the Warring States period and one of the famous "Four Lords of the Warring States" 
Huang Zhong 黃忠 (?–220), Shu Han Kingdom General during the Three Kingdoms period and one of the "Five Tiger Generals" under Liu Bei
Huang Zongxi 黃宗羲 (1610–1695), Ming-Qing dynasties naturalist, political theorist, philosopher, historian and educator, one of the famous "Eastern Zhe'jiang Three Huangs" (浙東三黃), one of the "Four Worthies of Yu'yao" (餘姚四賢) and one of the "Early Qing Five Grandmasters" (清初五大師)
Huang Zunxian 黃遵憲 (1848–1905), Late Qing dynasty scholar, poet, educator, diplomat and statesman

Modern figures

Huang Baitao 黃百韬 (1900–1948), Chinese Nationalist General active in the Second Sino-Japanese War and Chinese Civil War, for which he was twice awarded the Order of Blue Sky and White Sun, the highest honor a Chinese commander can achieve
Huang Bamei 黃八妹 (1906–1982), Chinese pirate and naval commander
Huang Binhong 黃宾虹 (1865–1955), Chinese art historian and Literati painter
Huang Biyun 黃碧雲 Helena Wong, Hong Kong legislative council member
Huang Daren 黃达人 (born 1945), Chinese mathematician
Huang Dao 黃道 (1900–1939), Chinese Workers' and Peasants' Red Army and the New Fourth Army General and Martyr active during the Anti-Japanese War
Huang Fu 黃郛 (1883–1936), Former Premier and Acting President of Republic of China
Huang Jie 黃杰 (1902–1995), Kuomintang General and Minister of Defense of the Republic of China
Huang Kan 黃侃 (1886–1935), Early Republic of China Period Chinese philologist, revolutionary and one of the Sinology experts known as "Seven Accomplished of Jiang'nan" 江南七彥. Together with famous Literary Figure Li Lianggong 李亮工, he is also known as "Southern Huang and Northern Li" 南黃北李.
Huang Kecheng 黃克诚 (1902–1986), Chinese military strategist, senior General, founding General of the People's Liberation Army and former head of People's Liberation Army General Staff Department
Huang Kun 黃昆 (1919–2005), physicist in solid-state physics. The Born–Huang approximation is partially named after him.
Huang Minlon 黃鸣龙 (1898–1979), Chinese organic chemist and pharmaceutical scientist; Pioneer and founder of modern pharmaceutical industries in China. The "Huang Modification" or "Huang-Minlon Modification" is named after Huang Minglon. It was the first time that a Chinese name appeared in an organic chemical reaction.
Huang Na 黄娜 (1996–2004), Chinese student studying in Singapore and murder victim.
Huang Rulun 黃如论, Chinese real estate developer, philanthropist and billionaire
Huang Weilu 黃緯祿 (1916–2011), One of China's pioneer missile scientists, one of the "Four Elders of China's Aerospace" and Winner of "Two Bombs, One Satellite" Award
Huang Xing 黃興 (1874–1916), Chinese revolutionary leader, militarist, and statesman, and the First Army Commander-in-chief of the Republic of China
Huang Xingxian 黃性贤 Huang Sheng Shyan (1910–1992), Kung fu and t'ai chi Master 
Huang Xinrui a.k.a. John "Buffalo" Wong (黃新瑞, 1914–41), ace fighter pilot; original contingent of American volunteer combat aviators joining the Chinese Air Force during the War of Resistance/WWII 
Huang Xuhua 黃旭華, One of the chief designers for China's first generation of nuclear submarines
Huang Yanpei 黃炎培 (1878–1965), Chinese educator, industrialist, politician, founding pioneer of the China Democratic League, former Minister of Education of the Early Republic of China and Deputy Prime Minister of early People's Republic of China
Huang Yongsheng 黃永勝 (1910–1983), Founding General of the People's Liberation Army, Former Commander of the Guangzhou Military Region and former head of People's Liberation Army General Staff Department
Huang Yuanyong 黃遠庸 (1885–1915), Renowned Chinese Author and Journalist during the late Qing dynasty and early Republic of China
Huang Yuetai 黃岳泰 Arthur Wong, Nine time Hong Kong Film Awards-winning Cinematographer, Actor, Screenwriter, Film producer and film director
Huang Zi 黃自 Huang Tzu (1904–1938), Chinese musician of the early 20th century
Huang Zhen 黄镇 (1909–1989), Former Minister of Culture and former Vice Minister of Foreign Affairs of People's Republic of China
Huang Zhiqian 黃志千 (1914–1965), Chinese aircraft designer
Huang Hongjia 黃宏嘉 (born 1924), Chinese Academician of Science in Microwave Theory and Optical Fibre
Huang Jiguang  黃继光 (1931–1952), Highly decorated Chinese soldier during the Korean War
Huang Chunming 黃春明 (born 1935), Taiwanese literary figure and teacher
Huang Shunliang 黃淳梁 Wong Shun Leung (1935–1997), Chinese martial artist in Wing Chun Kung Fu
Huang Ju 黃菊 (1938–2007), Former Vice Premier of China
Huang Hengmei 黃恒美 (born 1940),  Lieutenant General of the People's Liberation Army Air Force (PLAAF) of China and Commander of the Chengdu Military Region Air Force and the Lanzhou Military Region Air Force
Huang Zhan 黃沾 Wong Jim (1940–2004), Renowned Lyricist, Writer and one of the "Four Talent of Hong Kong" 香港四大才子
Huang Zhendong 黄镇东 (born 1941), Former Minister of Transport and Communist Party Secretary of Chongqing of the People's Republic of China
Huang Hongfa 黃宏发 Andrew Wong (born 1943), Last President of the Legislative Council of Hong Kong during British rule and the only person of Chinese ethnicity to have served in the position during British rule
Huang Mengfu 黃孟复 (born 1944), Vice Chairman of the China People's Political Consultative Conference and Chairman of the All-China Federation of Industry and Commerce
Huang Huahua 黃华华 (born 1946), Former Governor of Guangdong Province, China
Huang Xiaojing 黃小晶 (born 1946), Former Governor of Fujian Province, China
Huang Xianzhong 黃獻中 (born 1947), General in the People's Liberation Army (PLA) of the People's Republic of China, and Current Political Commissar of the PLA Shenyang Military Region
Huang Jianxin 黃建新 (born 1954), Chinese film director and film producer
Huang Shuxian 黃树贤 (born 1954), Minister of Civil Affairs, Former Minister of Supervision and Deputy Secretary of the Central Commission for Discipline Inspection of the People's Republic of China
Huang Xingguo 黃興國 (born 1954), Mayor of Tianjin, China
Huang Kunming 黃坤明 (born 1956), Head of the Propaganda Department of the Chinese Communist Party and a member of the Politburo of the Chinese Communist Party
Huang Nubo 黃怒波 (born 1956), Chinese real estate developer, entrepreneur, poet and billionaire
Huang Shu-kuang 黃曙光 (born 1957), Republic of China Navy Admiral, Commander of Navy and Chief of the General Staff
Huang Ming 黃鸣 (born 1958), Chinese solar energy researcher and entrepreneur
Huang Min-hui 黃敏惠 (born 1959), former Acting Chairperson and current vice-chairperson of Kuomintang Party, and Mayor of Chiayi City of the Republic of China
Huang Wei (born 1959), Chinese real estate developer and billionaire
Huang Zhixian 黃志贤 Che Yin Wong (born 1959), businessman and philanthropist from Hong Kong, China, and founder and Chairman of Kong Fung International Group
Huang Zihua 黃子華 Dayo Wong (born 1960), Hong Kong stand-up comedian, actor, presenter, screenwriter, and singer-songwriter who is the pioneer of stand-up comedy in Hong Kong
Huang Guoxian 黃国显 (born 1962), Lieutenant General of the People's Liberation Army Air Force (PLAAF) of China and Commander of the Nanjing Military Region Air Force
Huang Chih-hsien 黃智賢 (born in 1964), Taiwanese TV commentator, author and host on CTV and CTITV between 2014 and 2019
Huang Jianxiang 黃健翔 (born 1968), renowned sports commentator in China
Huang Guangyu 黃光裕 (born 1969), Chinese billionaire
Huang Zhang 黃章 Jack Wong (born 1976), Chinese entrepreneur, founder and former CEO of Meizu
Huang Xiaoming 黄晓明 (born 1977), Chinese actor
Huang Shengyi 黃圣依 (born 1983), Chinese actress
Huang Tingting 黄婷婷 (born 1992), Chinese singer and member of the idol group SNH48
Huang Zitao 黄子韬 ZTao (born 1993), rapper, singer, dancer, and martial arts expert, former member of the Chinese-South Korean boy band Exo
Huang Enru 黄恩茹 (born 1997), Chinese singer, actress, and member of the idol group BEJ48
Wong Yuk-hei 黃仁俊 (Stage Name Lucas; born 1999), Chinese singer based in South Korea and member of K-pop boy group NCT
Huang Minghao 黃明昊 (Justin) (born 2002) rapper and dancer of the C-pop group NEXT and Nine Percent.
 Huang Ren-Jun 黄仁俊 (born 2000), Singer and Dancer based in South Korea and member of K-pop boy group NCT Dream

Modern figures (Overseas Chinese)

 

Huang Biren 黄碧仁 (born 1969), Singaporean actress
Huang Bingxuan 黄秉璇 Wong Peng Soon (1918–1996), Chinese Malaysian badminton player who reigned as a top player in Malaya from the 1930s to the 1950s
Huang Bingyao 黄炳耀 Benjamin Wong Tape (1875–1967), Chinese New Zealander merchant
Huang Chenghui 黄呈辉 John K.C. Ng (1939–2013), Filipino Chinese businessman, philanthropist, former Presidential Advisor and Special Envoy for China Affairs
Huang Chuangshan 黄创山 Keeree Kanjanapas (born 1950), Thailand-based entrepreneur with extensive business interests in mass transit and real estate in the Kingdom of Thailand
Huang Dehui 黄德輝 Wong Doc-Fai (born 1948), internationally recognized master of Choy Li Fut kung fu and T'ai chi ch'uan
Huang Fa 黄发 Ung Huot (born 1945), Former Prime Minister of Cambodia
Huang Gantapawei 黄甘塔帕薇 Ing Kuntha Phavi អឹុង កន្ថាផាវី (born 1960), Current Minister of Women's Affairs of Cambodia
Huang Gencheng 黄根成 Wong Kan Seng (born 1946), former deputy prime minister of Singapore
Huang Hesheng 黄鹤声 Wong Hok-Sing (1915–1993), Chinese American actor and director
Huang Huixiang 黄惠祥 Michael Bambang Hartono (born 1941), Chinese Indonesian tobacco billionaire
Huang Huizhong 黄惠忠 Robert Budi Hartono (born 1940), Chinese Indonesian tobacco billionaire
Huang Jiading 黄家定 Ong Ka Ting (born 1956), President of Malaysian Chinese Association (MCA), Minister of Housing and Local Government and Acting Minister of Health of Malaysia
Huang Jia'e 黄嘉略 Arcadio Huang (1679–1716), French Chinese Pioneer who compiled first Chinese-French Lexicon and first Chinese Grammar in French 
Huang Jiaquan 黄家泉 Ong Ka Chuan (born 1954), Secretary-General of the Malaysian Chinese Association (MCA), Former Minister of Housing and Local Government and Current Second Minister for International Trade and Industry of Malaysia
Huang Jianguo 黄建国 Christianto Wibisono (1945–2021), prominent Chinese Indonesian business analyst in Indonesia
Huang Jinhui 黄金辉 Wee Kim Wee (1915–2005), former president of the Republic of Singapore
Huang Jinming 黄金明 James Wong (1922–2011), Malaysian Chinese Leader of the Opposition in Malaysia and Deputy Chief Minister of Sarawak
Huang Jinshao 黄锦绍 Delbert E. Wong (1920–2006), First Chinese American judge in the continental United States
Huang Jingyi 黄瀞亿 Ching He Huang (born 1978), British Chinese food writer and chef
Huang Junxiong 黄俊雄 Elvin Ng  (born 1980), Singaporean actor and model
Huang Kok Kwang 黄国光 Louis Ng (born 1978), Singaporean politician and founder of Animal Concerns Research and Education Society (ACRES)
Huang Liushuang 黄柳霜 Anna May Wong (1905–1961),  First Chinese American movie star and first Asian-American actress to gain international recognition
Huang Menzan 黄门赞 Mun Charn Wong (1918–2002), Chinese American businessman and first Chinese-American fighter pilot
Huang Peiqian 黄培谦 Puey Ungpakorn (1916–1999), Thai bureaucrat who played a central role in the shaping of Thailand's economic development and in the strengthening of its system of higher education
Huang Qiyao 黄齐耀 Tyrus Wong (born 1910), Chinese American painter, muralist, ceramicist, lithographer, and designer
Huang Qingchang 黄庆昌 Wee Kheng Chiang (1890–1978), Malaysian Chinese businessman and founder of United Overseas Bank(UOB) in Singapore
Huang Renxun 黃仁勳 Jen-Hsun Huang (born 1963), co-founder, President and CEO of Nvidia Corporation
Huang Renyu 黄仁宇 Ray Huang (1918–2000), Chinese historian and philosopher, best known in his later years for the idea of macro history
Huang Rongting 黄荣庭 Ng Eng Teng (1934–2001), Singaporean sculptor
Huang Ruyou 黄如佑 Loke Yew (1845–1917), businessman and philanthropist in British Malaya. He was regarded as the richest man in British Malaya during his time.
Huang Ruo 黄若 (born 1976), Chinese American Composer, pianist and vocalist
Huang Shaofan 黄少凡 Hasan Karman (born 1962), Former Mayor of Singkawang, West Kalimantan and First Chinese Mayor of Indonesia
Huang Shihao 黄士豪 Shiaan-Bin Huang, Member of Parliament of South Africa, Member of the African National Congress (ANC), Former Deputy Mayor of Newcastle in KwaZulu-Natal and Former Executive Councillor of Newcastle
Huang Shihou 黄诗厚 Alice S. Huang (born 1939), Chinese American biologist specialized Microbiology and Virology
Huang Shoushu 黄授书 Su-Shu Huang (1915–1977), Chinese American astrophysicist and asteroid 3014 Huangsushu was named after him
Huang Sitian 黄思恬 Carrie Wong (born New Year's Day 1994), Singaporean actress
Huang Tianxi 黄天喜 Thian Hee (1848–1925), Prominent military doctor, influential merchant and founder of the illustrious Sarasin Family in the Kingdom of Thailand
Huang Tingfang 黄廷芳 Ng Teng Fong (1928–2010), Singaporean real estate tycoon
Huang Tsenghao 黄俊豪 Hao Huang (born 1957), Chinese American concert pianist and music professor
Hao Huang, American mathematician
Huang Weibin 黄维彬 Ng Jui Ping, Singaporean Lieutenant General and former Chief of Defence Force (CDF) of the Singapore Armed Forces (SAF)
Huang Weiyuan 黄维源 Oei Wie Gwan (?–1963), Chinese Indonesian businessman and entrepreneur
Huang Wenbo 黄闻波 Boonchu Rojanastien (1921–2007), Former Deputy Prime Minister and Minister of Finance of Thailand
Huang Wenxiong 黄文雄 Peter Huang (born 1937), Japanese Chinese writer and activist active in Taiwan for democratization and human rights 
Huang Wenyong 黄文永 (1952-2013), Singaporean actor
Huang Xi 黄西 Joe Wong (born 1970), Chinese American stand-up comedian and chemical engineer
Huang Xinxiang 黄馨祥 Patrick Soon-Shiong (born 1952), South African-born American surgeon, medical researcher, businessman, philanthropist, and professor at University of California, Los Angeles
Huang Xutao 黄煦涛 Thomas Huang (born 1936), Chinese Academician of Science in computer vision, pattern recognition and human-computer interaction 
Huang Xuedong 黄学东 (born 1962), Microsoft's Chief speech scientist. He was named one of the "25 Geniuses of Next List 2016" in Wire magazine.
Huang Xuncai 黄循财 Lawrence Wong (born 1972), Deputy Prime Minister and Minister for Finance of Singapore 
Huang Yafu 黄亚福 Wong Ah Fook (1837–1918), Malaysian Chinese entrepreneur, and philanthropist who left an indelible imprint on the state of Johor in present-day Malaysia
Huang Yanhui 黄彦辉 Arthur C. Yap (born 1965), Former Filipino Chinese Secretary of Agriculture and Member of the House of Representatives of the Philippines
Huang Yanyan 黄燕燕 Ng Yen Yen (born 1946), Malaysian Chinese politician, former Minister of Tourism in the Malaysian Cabinet and Current Vice-president of Malaysian Chinese Association (MCA)
Huang Yicong 黄亦聪 Eka Tjipta Widjaja (born 1923), Chinese Indonesian billionaire
Huang Yijing 黄以静 Flossie Wong-Staal (1947–2020), Chinese American virologist and molecular biologist. She was the first scientist to clone HIV and determine the function of its genes, a major step in proving that HIV is the cause of AIDS.
Huang Yiliang 黄奕良 (born 1961), Singaporean actor
Huang Yiming 黄颐铭 Eddie Huang (born 1981), Chinese American restaurateur, chef, food personality, writer, and Attorney
Huang Yishan 黄易山 Yishan Wong, CEO of Reddit, co-founder at Mountain View coworking space Sunfire Offices, and Advisor at Quora, an online knowledge market
Huang Yiyu 黄毅瑜 James Wong (born 1959), Chinese American Television Producer, Writer and Film Director
Huang Yingxian 黄英贤 Penny Wong (born 1968), Senator and  Minister for Foreign Affairs, Former Minister for Finance and Deregulation, and Minister for Climate Change, Energy Efficiency and Water of Australia
Huang Yonghong 黄永宏 Ng Eng Hen (born 1958), Minister of Defence of Singapore
Huang Yudehu 黄欲德虎 Cham Prasidh (born 1951), Current Minister of Industry and Handicrafts and Former Minister of Commerce of Cambodia
Huang Yutang 黄玉堂 Nelson Wang (born 1950), Indian Chinese restaurateur 
Huang Yuanling 黄苑玲 Ruthlane Uy Asmundson (born 1945), Former Mayor of the City of Davis, California and First Female Filipino Migrant to be elected into the position of mayor in an American city
Huang Zhelun 黄哲伦 David Henry Hwang (born 1957), Chinese American playwright, librettist, screenwriter, and theater professor
Huang Zhexian 黄哲贤 Wong Jeh Shyan (born 1964), Former CEO of CommerceNet Singapore, and co-founder and CEO of Ecommerce Gateway Pte. Ltd.
Huang Zhentan 黄祯谭 Alfonso A. Uy, Filipino Chinese businessman, and former and first President of the Federation of Filipino Chinese Chambers of Commerce & Industry
Huang Zhiming 黄志明 Ng Chee Meng (born 1968), Minister for Education (Schools), Senior Minister of State (Ministry of Transport), Second Minister for Transport and Former Chief of Defence Force of Singapore
Huang Zhiping 黄志平 Ng Chee Peng, Singaporean Naval Admiral and Former Chief of the Republic of Singapore Navy
Huang Zhiqin 黄志勤 Ng Chee Khern, Singaporean Major General, Former Chief of the Republic of Singapore Air Force and Permanent Secretary (Defence Development) in Singapore's Ministry of Defence
Huang Zhixiang 黄志祥 Robert Ng (born 1952), Chairman of Hong Kong property development conglomerate Sino Group and Singaporean Real Estate Billionaire
Huang Zhiyang 黄智阳 Ng Chee Yang (born 1989), Singaporean singer
Huang Zhonghan 黄仲涵 Oei Tiong Ham (1866–1924), Chinese Indonesian businessman
Huang Zida 黄自达 Oei Tjoe Tat (1922–1996), First Chinese Indonesian Minister of State of Indonesia 
Huang Zongren 黄宗仁 Wee Chong Jin (1917–2005), Judge and the First Chief Justice of Singapore
Huang Zongzhan 黄宗沾 James Wong Howe (1899–1976), Chinese American cinematographer
Huang Zuyao 黄祖耀 Wee Cho Yaw (born 1929), Singaporean businessman, and the current Chairman of the United Overseas Bank (UOB) and United Industrial Corporation (UIC) in Singapore

Hwang

Hoàng/Huỳnh
The Vietnamese versions of this surname are Hoàng and Huỳnh. According to Lê Trung Hoa, a Vietnamese scholar, approximately 5.1 percent of Vietnamese people have this surname. The original form of this surname was Hoàng. But in southern Vietnam, Hoàng was ordered to be changed (excluding the Hoàng Trọng family) to Huỳnh due to a naming taboo with the name of Lord Nguyễn Hoàng.

Notable people with Hoàng surname

Hoàng Sĩ Trinh (poet) (1920-2011), known professionally as Hà Thượng Nhân
Hoàng Anh Tuấn (born 1985), Vietnamese weightlifter
Hoàng Cầm (poet) (1922–2010), Vietnamese poet, playwright, and novelist
Hoàng Cầm (general) (1920–2013), Major General of People's Army of Vietnam 
Hoàng Cầm (1916–1996), Inventor of the Việt Minh Hoàng Cầm stove
Hoàng Cao Khải 黃高啟 (1850–1933), Viceroy of Tonkin (locally known as Bắc Kỳ), the northernmost of the three parts of Vietnam under French colonial rule, Minister of War 兵部尚書, Duke of Duyên Mậu Quận (Duyên Mậu Quận Công 延茂郡公) and Prince's Tutor 太子太傅 of Nguyễn dynasty
Hoàng Cơ Minh (1935–1987), First Chairman of the Việt Tân (Vietnam Reform Party) and Democracy Activist
Hoàng Đăng Huệ (1932–2015), Major General of Ministry of Defence and Political Commissar of the High Command of Tank and Armour of Vietnam
Hoàng Diệu 黃耀 (1828–1882), Nguyễn dynasty Governor of Hanoi on behalf of Emperor Tự Đức resident in Huế
Hoàng Hiệp (1931–2013), Vietnamese songwriter and recipient of the Hồ Chí Minh Prize in 2000
Hoàng Hồng Cẩm (born 1959), Vietnamese painter
Hoàng Kế Viêm 黃繼炎 (1820–1909), Nguyễn dynasty General, Dong'ge Grand Secretariat 東閣大學士, Viscount of Địch Trung (Địch Trung Tử 迪忠子) and Count of Địch Trung (Địch Trung Bá 迪忠伯)
Hoang Kieu, Vietnamese-American billionaire
Hoàng Lập Ngôn (1910–2006), Vietnamese painter
Hoàng Minh Chính (1922–2008),  Vietnamese politician, dissident, and one of the best-known figures and ideologists of the Vietnamese Communist Party during the 1960s
Hoàng Thị Loan (1868–1901), Mother of Hồ Chí Minh
Hoàng Thi Thơ (1929–2001), Vietnamese Songwriter
Hoàng Tích Chu (1897–1933), Vietnamese journalist
Hoàng Tích Chù (1912–2003), Vietnamese painter
Hoàng Trọng (1922–1998), Vietnamese songwriter
Hoàng Trung Hải (born 1959), Deputy Prime Minister of Vietnam
Hoàng Tụy (born 1927), Prominent Vietnamese applied mathematician
Hoàng Văn Chí (1913–1988), One of the first Vietnamese political writers, and prominent intellectual who was an opponent of colonialism and later of communism in Vietnam
Hoàng Văn Hoan (1905–1991), Founding Member of the Indochinese Communist Party, and a Politburo Member of the Lao Dong Party (Vietnam Workers' Party-VWP) from 1960 to 1976
Hoàng Văn Thái (1915–1986), Vietnamese General and Chief of General Staff of Vietnam People's Army
Hoàng Xuân Hãn 黃春罕 (1908–1996), Vietnamese Professor of mathematics, linguist, historian and educationalist
Hoàng Xuân Sính, Vietnamese Mathematician, Founder of Thăng Long University and Recipient of the Ordre des Palmes Académiques
Hoàng Xuân Vinh (born 1974), Vietnamese Shooter and First Ever Olympic Gold Medallist of Vietnam
Hoàng Thị Thùy (born 1992), Vietnamese model and beauty queen who was appointed as Miss Universe Vietnam 2019

Notable people with Huỳnh surname

Alex Huynh, Vietnamese-American martial artist and stuntman
Carol Huynh (born 1980), Vietnamese-Canadian freestyle wrestler
Huỳnh Công Út (born 1951),  Photographer for the Associated Press (AP) who works out of Los Angeles. He won the 1973 Pulitzer Prize for Spot News Photography for "The Terror of War", depicting children in flight from a napalm bombing.
Huỳnh Phú Sổ (1920–1947), Founder of the Hòa Hảo religious tradition
Huỳnh Sanh Thông (1926–2008), Vietnamese-American scholar and translator
Huỳnh Tấn Phát (1913–1989), Former Vice President and Prime Minister of Vietnam
Huỳnh Thúc Kháng 黃叔抗 (1876–1947), Vietnamese anti-colonialist
Huỳnh Tường Đức 黃奉德 Nguyễn Huỳnh Đức 阮黃德 (1748–1819), Nguyễn dynasty Founding Grand General (輔國上將軍, 上柱國), Grand Tutor 太傅, Duke of Kiến Xương (Kiến Xương Quận Công 建昌郡公) and one of the "Five Tiger-Generals of Gia Định" (Gia Định ngũ hổ tướng 嘉定五虎將)
Huỳnh Văn Cao (1927–2013), Major General in the Army of the Republic of Vietnam
Huỳnh Văn Gấm (1922–1987),  Vietnamese painter

Fictional characters with surname Huang

Huang Feihu 黃飛虎, General of Shang dynasty and later of Zhou dynasty, Prince of Wu'cheng 國武成王 and Great Emperor of the Mount Tai "Dongyue Taishan Tianqi Rensheng Dadi" 東嶽泰山天齊仁聖大帝 who oversees the fortunes and fates of mortals and the Eighteen Levels of Hell in Chinese classic novel Fengshen Yanyi (The Investiture of the Gods)
Huang Gun 黃滾, General of Shang dynasty and later of Zhou dynasty in Chinese classic novel Fengshen Yanyi (The Investiture of the Gods)
Huang Rong 黃蓉, Daughter of Huang Yaoshi and Beggars' Gang's chief in Jin Yong's wuxia novel The Legend of the Condor Heroes and its sequel The Return of the Condor Heroes
Huang Xin 黃信, Nickname: "Guardian of the Three Mountains",  Scouting general of the Liangshan cavalry, 38th of the 108 Liangshan heroes and Deity of Di'sha Star 地煞星 in Water Margin, one of the Four Great Classical Novels of Chinese literature
Huang Yaoshi 黃藥師, Nickname: "Eastern Heretic" (東邪), Master of Peach Blossom Island and one of the Five Greats of the wulin (martial artists' community) during the Song dynasty in Jin Yong's wuxia novel "The Legend of the Condor Heroes" and its sequel "The Return of the Condor Heroes"
Huang Yuanji 黃元濟, General of Shang dynasty and Deity of Can'chu Star 蠶畜星 in Chinese classic novel Fengshen Yanyi (The Investiture of the Gods)

See also 
 Hwang (Korean name)
 Ng (surname)
 Wong (surname)

Notes

External links 

 
Prominent People with Surname Huang
Prominent Korean People with Surname Hwang
Ancient Huang State and Lord Meng of Huang
Nan'lu Gong Huang Clan 
Hua'rong Huang Clan
Gui'zhou Huang Clan
天下黄姓出江夏
黄姓家谱
黄姓简史(A Brief History of the Family Name Huang)

Chinese-language surnames
Vietnamese-language surnames
Individual Chinese surnames
Surnames of Vietnamese origin